CeBIT was the largest and most internationally representative computer expo. The trade fair was held each year on the Hanover fairground, the world's largest fairground, in Hanover, Germany. In its day, it was considered a barometer of current trends and a measure of the state of the art in information technology. It was organized by Deutsche Messe AG.

CeBIT is a German language acronym for Centrum für Büroautomation, Informationstechnologie und Telekommunikation, which translates as "Center for Office Automation, Information Technology and Telecommunication".

The final CeBIT took place from 11 to 15 June 2018.

History
CeBIT was traditionally the computing part of the Hanover Fair, a big industry trade show held every year. It was established in 1970, with the opening of the Hanover fairground's new Hall 1, then the largest exhibition hall in the world. However, in the 1980s the information technology and telecommunications part was straining the resources of the trade fair so much that it was given a separate trade show starting in 1986, which was held four weeks earlier than the main Hanover Fair.

The number of visitors for the new exhibition increased to 830,000 in 2001, but by 2007 the CeBIT expo attendance had shrunk to around 200,000, then attendance rebounded to 334,000 by 2010. The 2008 expo was marred by police raids of 51 exhibitors for patent infringement. In 2009, the U.S. state of California became official Partner State of Germany's IT and telecommunications industry association, BITKOM, and of CeBIT 2009. focusing on environmentally-friendly technologies.

From 2007 till 2013, the fair acted as the World Championship (Grand Final) of Intel Extreme Masters. The championship was reallocated to Katowice since 2014.

On 28 November 2018, Deutsche Messe AG announced that due to declining visitor and exhibitioner attendance, CeBIT would be canceled for the foreseeable
future. This makes CeBIT 2018 the final event.

Other CeBIT-branded shows
As CeBIT continued to grow quickly and was becoming too big on its own, it was decided to concentrate on the professional market, while the home and entertainment market was given a separate show, CeBIT Home, during summer, planned to be biennial. However, after being held twice (in 1996 and 1998), the 2000 CeBIT Home (had originally been scheduled to be held in Leipzig due to the Expo 2000 being held in Hanover) was cancelled and the project was abandoned.

Since 1999 the CeBIT sponsor Deutsche Messe AG ("German Trade Show, Inc.") has organized trade shows outside of Germany bearing the CeBIT name:
Internet +, powered by CeBIT (formerly CeBIT Asia), in Shanghai, China
CeBIT Australia, in Sydney
CeBIT Eurasia Bilişim, in Istanbul, Turkey
CeBIT America/USA in New York City, United States. It was held in 2003 and 2004, but subsequently cancelled in 2005.
CeBIT India, in Bangalore, India
BITS Mexico, powered by CeBIT, in México City.
CeBIT ASEAN Thailand, in Bangkok, Thailand.

CeBIT Global Conferences
Running over a five-day period in Hanover, Germany, the CeBIT Global Conferences (CGC) are staged congruently with the CeBIT exhibition. The conferences are dedicated to providing a 360° overview of the digital industry's four core markets: IT, Telecommunications, Digital Media and Consumer Electronics. Noted industry figures and researchers from across the globe are invited to speak on the latest relevant trends and innovations as well as their impact on society and the working world. The conference is divided up into keynote speeches, talks and panel discussions. The CGC conferences are produced by Deutsche Messe AG, with the German BITKOM association acting as the CGC patron since 2009. In 2014, the CGC were staged with 140 speakers on three stages with a program of 70 conference hours and 3000 participants. Target groups of the conference are CXOs, managers, experts, visionaries and out-of-the-box thinkers, Conference languages are English and German.

Recent conferences have featured the following keynote themes:
2008: "Improving Life in the Global Village". This installment of CGC attracted 1900 visitors and 43 speakers attending the keynotes and discussion sessions.
2009: "How Will We Be Working, Living and Communicating in the Coming Years?" This CGC drew 3,133 visitors from 88 nations, with some 2,200 guests following the conference via live streaming.
2010: "The Challenges of a Changing World - ICT for Better Lives and Better Business", attracting some 4,000 guests from more than 100 nations. Just under 4,000 guests also visited the conference via live streaming.

The motto of the CeBIT Global Conferences for 2011 was "The Power of Creativity and Innovation".

Speaker list 2014
Steve Wozniak, co-founder Apple Computer
Jimmy Wales, founder Wikipedia 
Eugene Kaspersky, CEO and Chairman, Kaspersky Lab  
Mark Shuttleworth, founder, Canonical  
Neelie Kroes, Vice President, European Commission 
Sir Nigel Shadbolt, Chairman and co-founder, Open Data Institute (ODI) 
Dean Douglas, CEO Unify 
Cristina Riesen, General Manager Europe, Evernote 
Mikko Hyppönen, Chief Research Officer, F-Secure

Over the past years, speakers at the CeBIT Global Conferences have included Gov. Arnold Schwarzenegger, Governor of California; Kevin Turner, COO, Microsoft, Craig Barrett, Chairman of the Board, Intel, Jon Iwata SVP Marketing & Communications, IBM, Reid Hoffman, Chairman and CEO, LinkedIn; Mukund Krishna, CEO Suyati Inc; Scott Durchslag, COO, Skype; Dr. Werner Vogels, Vice President & CTO, Amazon,  Stewart Butterfield, Co-founder of Flickr.com, Michael T. Jones, Chief Technology Advocate, Google & Founder of Google Earth; Mark Kingdon, CEO, LindenLab.

CeBIT Awards
CeBIT was a platform for recognising achievement by ICT businesses, particularly in Australia. The awards include the Excellence in Communications Award, the Advanced Retail Technology Award, the Innovative IT Security Award, and the Early Innovators Award. Notable past winners include Motorola, McAfee and eWAY.

See also

 List of computer-related awards
CES (Las Vegas, Nevada, US)
COMPUTEX (Taipei, Taiwan)
SIMO TCI (Madrid, Spain)

References

External links

The history of CeBIT 
CeBIT Australia official website

Computer-related awards
Computer-related trade shows
Trade fairs in Germany
Companies based in Hanover
Recurring events established in 1970
1970 establishments in Germany
Annual events in Germany
Recurring events disestablished in 2018